Mastigoteuthis agassizii is a species of whip-lash squid. It is the type species of the genus.

References

Verrill, A.E. 1881. Report on the Cephalopods, and on Some Additional Species Dredged by the U.S. Fish Commission Steamer "Fish Hawk", During the Season of 1880. Bulletin of the Museum of Comparative Zoology 8(5): 99-116.
Verrill, A.E. 1881. The Cephalopods of the North-eastern Coast of America. Part II. The Smaller Cephalopods, Including the "Squids" and the Octopi, with Other Allied Forms. Transactions of the Connecticut Academy of Sciences 5: 259-446.

External links

Tree of Life web project: Mastigoteuthis agassizii

Mastigoteuthis
Cephalopods of North America
Molluscs of the Atlantic Ocean
Molluscs of the United States
Cephalopods described in 1881
Marine molluscs of Europe
Cephalopods of Europe